Gurdwara Mata Sunder Kaur is historical site visited by Mata Sundari, Baba Deep Singh and Bhai Mani Singh while his trip to Delhi after evacuation of Guru Gobind Singh, his family and Khalsa Army from Anandpur Sahib. The Gurdwara is located in Sector 70, Mohali, Punjab. The Gurdwara is controlled by Budha Dal Nihang Sikhs.

See also
 Ajitgarh
 Gurdwara Amb Sahib
 Sector 70, Mohali

References

Gurdwaras in Punjab, India
Mohali
Buildings and structures in Mohali